Social promotion is the practice of promoting a student (usually a general education student, rather than a special education student) to the next grade after the current school year, regardless of if they learned the necessary material or if they are often absent. This is done in order to keep the students with their peers by age, that being the intended social grouping. It is sometimes referred to as promotion based on seat time, or the amount of time the child spent sitting in school. This is based on the enrollment criteria for Kindergarten, which is being 4 or 5 years old (5 or 6 years old for 1st graders) at the beginning of the school year. The intention is for the students to be able to graduate from high school level education before their 19th birthday.

Advocates of social promotion argue that promotion is done in order not to harm the students' or their classmates' self-esteem, to encourage socialization by age (together with their age cohort), to facilitate student involvement in sports teams, or to promote a student who is weak in one subject on the basis of strength in the other areas.

In Canada and the United States, social promotion is normally limited to primary education, because comprehensive secondary education is more flexible about determining which level of students take which classes due to the graduation requirements, which makes the concept of social promotion much less meaningful. For example, student can study with his age cohort in social studies but with younger students in math class (based on his math level assessment, summative or formative).
 
In some countries, grade retention is allowed when students haven't learned the necessary material or if they are often absent.

The opposite of social promotion would be to promote students once they learned the necessary material. This might be called "merit promotion", similar to the concept of a "merit civil service". The scope of the promotion might then be either to the next grade or to the next course in the same field. In a curriculum based on grades, this is usually called "mid-term promotion". In a curriculum based on courses rather than grades, the promotion is open-ended and is better understood as satisfying a prerequisite for the next course.

Pros
Supporters of social promotion policies do not defend social promotion so much as say that retention is even worse. They argue that retention is not a cost-effective response to poor performance when compared to cheaper or more effective interventions, such as additional tutoring and summer school. They point to a wide range of research findings that show no advantage to, or even harm from, retention, and the tendency for gains from retention to wash out.

Harm from grade retention cited by these critics include:
 Increased drop-out rates of repeaters over time
 This may be proven true by data from studies by Allenseorth (2005), and the data recorded by Frey (2005) where drop out rates in Minnesota schools for non-repeaters nearly doubled from non-repeaters at 12.4% and to retained student drop out rates jumping to 27.2%
 No evidence of long-term academic benefit for retained students
 Increased rates of mental disorders and dangerous behaviors such as drinking, drug-use, crime, teenage pregnancy, depression, and suicide among repeaters as compared with similarly performing promoted students.
 Feeling left out with kids from different age groups, which means that being too old may lead to bullying, having fewer friends, and being ridiculed.

Critics of retention also note that retention has hard financial costs for school systems: requiring a student to repeat a grade is essentially to add one student for a year to the school system, assuming that the student does not drop out. Some parents worry that older retained students will victimize younger students.

Cons
Opponents of social promotion argue that it cheats children of education. When socially promoted children reach higher levels of education, they may be unprepared, may fail courses, and may not make normal progress towards graduation.

Opponents of social promotion argue that it has the following negative impacts:
 Students who have to wait for the end of the school year to move on to more advanced studies are denied present success.
 Students promoted to a class for which they are known to be unable to do the work are positioned for further failure.
 Students can have so many easy successes during subsequent years that either their study skills deteriorate or they become so frustrated with banal lessons that they drop out.
 Students can have many failures during the subsequent years, which is frustrating for them and may increase the risk of dropping out.
 Their frustration at sitting through "baby classes" can lead to classroom disruptions or the humiliation of others.
 Their frustration can lead to classroom disruptions, which can diminish the achievement of others.
 It sends the message to all students that they can get by without working hard.
 It forces the next teacher to deal with already-prepared and under-prepared students while trying to teach the prepared
 It gives parents and students a false sense of their children's progress.
 It creates social fiefdoms of same-age peers, their consequent peer pressure causing bullying and drug abuse.

Some hold that most students at the elementary school level don't take their education seriously and therefore retention is most likely not to be effective. Since most middle school students value their education more , retention should be used if they are judged not to have adequate skills before entering high school.

It can also be argued that social promotion, by keeping most students at the elementary school level from advancing at their own pace, is the reason they don't take their education seriously. Eliminating the social promotion system would then make the incentives of merit promotion more effective at the beginning of each student's academic career.

Statistics 
In the United States,  retention is more common for boys and non-white students than it is for girls and white students. By the time students reach high school, the retention rate for boys is about ten percentage points higher than for girls. In the early grades, retention rates are similar among white Americans, African Americans, and Hispanic Americans. By high school, the rate is about 15 percentage points higher for African Americans and Hispanics than for whites.  Across all grades, black students are three times more likely to be grade-retained than are white students; Hispanics are twice as likely.

There are arguments for and against both social promotion and retention. When students are socially promoted, they may be disadvantaged by not having learned material. But retained students are older than their peers in the classroom, which can cause social problems. African American boys are the group that are most often retained in school. By the time the students reach the ages of 15–17, 50% of African American boys are either below the grade of their peers that age or have dropped out of school. In contrast, only 30% of white girls ages 15–17 are below the modal grade of their peers.

In 1999, educational researcher Robert Hauser said of the New York City school district:  "In its plan to end social promotion the administration appears to have [included] ... an enforcement provision—flunking kids by the carload lot—about which the great mass of evidence is strongly negative.  And this policy will hurt poor and minority children most of all." [Glavin, C. (2014, February 5). Studies. Retrieved from http://www.k12academics.com/education-issues/social-promotion/studies#.WSBLyLwrK8o]

In a study of 99,000 Florida students, Jay P. Greene and Marcus A. Winters  found that "retained students slightly outperformed socially promoted students in reading in the first year after retention, and these gains increased substantially in the second year. Results were robust across two distinct IV comparisons: an across-year approach comparing students who were essentially separated by the year in which they happened to have been born, and a regression discontinuity design." ["Revisiting Grade Retention: An evaluation of Florida's test-based Promotion Policy in Education and Finance Policy, MIT Press, 2006]

History 
With the proliferation of graded schools in the middle of the 19th century, retention became a common practice, as were mid-term promotions.  In fact, a century ago, approximately half of all American students were retained at least once before the age of 13.

Social promotion began to spread in the 1930s along with concerns about the psychosocial effects of retention.  This trend reversed in the 1980s, as concern about slipping academic standards rose.

The practice of grade retention in the U.S. has been climbing steadily since the 1980s, although local educational agencies may or may not follow this trend.  For example, in 1982, New York City schools stopped social promotions. Within a few years, the problems caused by the change in policy led the city to start social promotion again. In 1999, the city once again eliminated social promotion; it reinstated it after the number of repeaters had mounted to 100,000 by 2004, driving up costs and leading to cutbacks in numerous programs, including those for helping underachievers.

Alternatives
Apart from the social promotion, there is the grade retention, in which students repeat a grade when they are judged to be a low performer. The aim of grade retention is to help the student learn and sharpen skills such as organization, management, study skills, literacy and academic which are very important before entering the next grade, college and the labor force.

In the US simple social promotion was not held to be an adequate alternative to the grade retention.  Current theories among academic scholars prefer to address underperformance problems with remedial help. Students with singular needs or disabilities require special teaching approaches, equipment, or care within or outside a regular classroom. Since students with intellectual disabilities are handled separately, schools may treat two students with identical achievements differently, if one of the students is low-performing, but typically developing,  and the other student is low-performing due to a disability.

Apart from the social promotion, there is the merit promotion, either by mid-term promotion or by using a course-based curriculum with a directed acyclic graph of prerequisites similar to college curricula. This alternative is unique in allowing each student to advance at his or her own pace. It would also save school districts money by ending the practice of warehousing "talented and gifted students" and allowing those students to graduate early.

See also
 Grade retention
 Grade skipping

References

Further reading 
 Allensworth, E. M. (2005). Dropout rates after high-stakes testing in elementary school: A study of the contradictory effects of Chicago's efforts to end social promotion. Educational Evaluation and Policy Analysis, 27(4), 341–364.
 Frey, N. (2005). Retention, social promotion, and academic redshirting: What do we know and need to know? Remedial and Special Education, 26(6), 332–346.
 Glavin, C. (2014, February 5). Studies. Retrieved from http://www.k12academics.com/education-issues/social-promotion/studies#.WSBLyLwrK8o
 "Schools Repeat Social Promotion Problems", Sheryl McCarthy, Newsday, March 28, 2002.
 "What If We Ended Social Promotion?", Education Week, April 7, 1999, pp 64–66.
 Hard Facts, Dangerous Half-Truths, and Total Nonsense: Profiting from Evidence-Based Management, Jeffrey Pfeffer and Robert I. Sutton, 2006

Education issues
Education in the United States
Education in Canada
Education reform
Standards-based education